Tjuvjakt is a Swedish rap group from Lidingö, Stockholm. The group consists of members Fredrik "Woodz" Eriksson, Olle Grafström, Jesper Swärd, Arvid Lundquist and Kid Eriksson. As of March 2021, the group has released five studio albums. Tjuvjakt's most successful single yet is "Tårarna i halsen", which peaked at number six on the Swedish Singles Chart. In total, the song charted for 31 weeks. In 2020, the group released the single "Kärt återseende", which peaked at number 38 on the same chart. The EP Tomma fickor was subsequently released, peaking at number 26 on the Swedish Albums Chart.

Discography

Albums

Extended plays

Singles

Notes

References 

Musical groups established in 2012
Swedish hip hop groups
Swedish-language singers
Musical groups from Stockholm
2012 establishments in Sweden